Chaumont is a commune of France, and the capital (or préfecture) of the Haute-Marne department. , it has a population of 21,847.

Chaumont station has rail connections to Paris, Reims, Dijon, Mulhouse and regional destinations.

History

Historically, Chaumont was the seat of the Counts of Bassigny and later of Champagne, receiving a charter in 1190. It was the venue of an offensive treaty against Napoleon I signed by the United Kingdom, Austria, Prussia, and Russia in 1814, by which they agreed to continue war until France returned to its 1792 boundaries.

Chaumont was bombed in 1940 and 1944 during World War II. From 1951 to 1967, the United States Air Force under NATO operated the Chaumont-Semoutiers Air Base on the outskirts of the city.

Notable buildings
 The church of St-Jean-Baptiste dates from the 13th century, the choir and lateral chapels belonging to the 15th and 16th. In the interior the sculptured triforium (15th century), the spiral staircase in the transept and a Holy Sepulchre are of interest. 
 The Tour Hautefeuille (a keep of the 11th century) is the principal relic of a château of the counts of Champagne
 In the Square Philippe-Lebon stands a statue of the engineer Philippe Lebon (1767–1804), born in Haute-Marne. The bronze statue was melted down during the second world war and replaced by a stone copy.

Population

Notable people
Edmé Bouchardon (1698–1762), sculptor
Luc Chatel (born 1964), politician
Lucie Décosse (born 1981), judo player
Denis Decrès (1761–1820), Minister of the French Navy
André Godard (1881–1965), architect and archaeologist
Emmanuel Guillaume-Rey (1837–1916), archaeologist, topographer and orientalist
Jean Masson (1907–1964), politician
Louise Michel (1830–1905), anarchist
Christian Pineau (1904–1995), politician
Nicole Rieu (born 1949), singer and director

Sport
The Chaumont Volley-Ball 52, is a volleyball club playing in Pro A (volleyball), created in 1996. The club became champion of France in Ligue A during the 2016–2017 season. She twice finished second in 2017-2018 and 2018–2019 seasons. On 2 April 2017, for the first time in its history, the CVB52 became a finalist in the 2016–17 CEV Challenge Cup. On 7 October 2017 in Mulhouse, the CVB52HM won a second title by becoming champion of the French Supercup. The club also participated in the CEV Champions League and CEV Cup.

The Chaumont FC, is a football club, created in 1957. Which spent 16 seasons in the second division (Ligue 2) under the name of E.C.A.C. She finished second in the 1971 season.

ECAC Rugby Chaumont, created in 1968. Playing in the 1st Grand-Est Series for the 2018–2019 season. The club finished second in the Burgundy Championship 2nd series 2018 and second in the Grand-Est Championship 2nd series 2019.

The Chaumont Handball 52 or ECAC Chaumont Handball, created in 1963. Playing in the National 2 women's season since 2018–2019.

ECAC Basket Chaumont, created in 1946. Playing in Regional Championship 2.

The Phénix de Chaumont, is an American football club playing in the Grand-Est Regional Challenge, finalist of the 2018 Grand-Est Regional Challenge championship.

La Chaumontaise Gymnastique, is a gymnastics club founded in 1883 under the name of "Gymnastics and Shooting Society"; it is also the oldest association in the town of Chaumont.

The Tomb Raiders of Chaumont, is a Roller in-line hockey and hockey club.

The Vélo Club Chaumontais is a cycling club created in 1923. The association is one of the oldest in the city.

Twin towns – sister cities

Chaumont is twinned with:
 Ashton-under-Lyne, England, United Kingdom (1956)
 Ivrea, Italy (1983)
 Bad Nauheim, Germany (1992)
 Owasso, United States (2017)

See also
Communes of the Haute-Marne department

References

External links

Official website 
Picture of Chaumont Basilica

Communes of Haute-Marne
Prefectures in France
Champagne (province)